The 1925 Wisconsin Badgers football team was an American football team that represented the University of Wisconsin in the 1925 Big Ten Conference football season. The team compiled a 6–1–1 record (3–1–1 against conference opponents), finished in third place in the Big Ten Conference, and outscored all opponents by a combined total of 131 to 50. George Little was in his first year as Wisconsin's head coach. The team was ranked No. 8 in the nation in the Dickinson System ratings released in January 1926. Little had been the head coach at Michigan in 1924; the Badgers suffered their only defeat of the 1925 season to Little's former team.

Steve Polaski was the team captain. Halfback Doyle Harmon was selected by Walter Eckersall as a first-team player on the 1925 All-Big Ten Conference football team.

The team played its home games at Camp Randall Stadium. The capacity was more than doubled for the 1925 season from 14,000 to 29,783. During the 1925 season, the average attendance at home games was 15,118.

Schedule

References

Wisconsin
Wisconsin Badgers football seasons
Wisconsin Badgers football